Edwin Bryant may refer to:

 Edwin Bryant (alcalde) (1805–1869), second alcalde of San Francisco, American newspaper editor and author of What I Saw in California
 Edwin Bryant (author) (born 1957), American Indologist
 Edwin Bryant (cricketer) (1886–1948), English cricketer
 Edwin E. Bryant (1835–1903), American lawyer and politician

See also
 Edward Bryant (1945–2017), American science fiction and horror writer